JALways was a subsidiary of Japan Airlines registered in Shinagawa, Tokyo, Japan, with its headquarters in the  at Narita International Airport in Narita.  As of November 2010, it operated to 15 destinations in nine countries.

The airline had its main hub at Narita International Airport, with its secondary hub at Osaka International Airport. JALways was fully merged into Japan Airlines on 1 December 2010.

Destinations
JALways, under then-name Japan Air Charter operated its first commercial flight from Fukuoka to Honolulu, USA in July 1991 with a McDonnell Douglas DC-10 aircraft, after receiving its air operator's certificate. In 1992, the airline introduced regular passenger charter services between Osaka and Bangkok. Initially, Japan Air Charter operated its passenger services as regular charter flights only, these were passenger flights that were operated by the airline on behalf of their parent, Japan Airlines. In 1999, Japan Air Charter was rebranded to JALways and was granted scheduled services rights in 1999. In the following years, the airline's operations expanded to more cities in Japan and to other countries across Asia, including Australia, Indonesia, India, Philippines and Vietnam. The destination list shows airports that were served by JALways as part of its regular charter and scheduled passenger services from the start of services in 1991 to the time it ceased to exist as an independent operation.

References

Lists of airline destinations